Haemimontus was a late Roman and early Byzantine province, situated in northeastern Thrace. It was subordinate to the Diocese of Thrace and to the praetorian prefecture of the East. Its capital was Adrianople, and it was headed by a praeses. The province was superseded by the Theme of Thrace during the 7th century, but survived as an Orthodox ecclesiastical metropolis until late Byzantine times.

Honours
Hemimont Plateau in Graham Land, Antarctica is named after the province.

References

Sources 
 

Roman Thrace
Greece in the Roman era
Bulgaria in the Roman era
Provinces of the Byzantine Empire
Late Roman provinces
Praetorian prefecture of the East